New Castle Armory is a historic National Guard armory located at Shenango Township, Lawrence County, Pennsylvania. It was built in 1938, and is an "I"-plan stone building consisting of a one- to two-story administration building, with a connected riding hall and former stable building. It was built as a Federal public works project and is in the Art Deco style.

It was added to the National Register of Historic Places in 1991.

References

Armories on the National Register of Historic Places in Pennsylvania
Art Deco architecture in Pennsylvania
Infrastructure completed in 1938
Buildings and structures in Lawrence County, Pennsylvania
National Register of Historic Places in Lawrence County, Pennsylvania